Cronholm is a Swedish surname. Notable people with the surname include:

Josefine Cronholm (born 1971), Swedish jazz vocalist, singer, and songwriter
Stina Cronholm (born 1936), Swedish athlete

See also
Kronholm

Swedish-language surnames